The 2021–22 Scottish League Cup final was an association football match that took place at Hampden Park, Glasgow on 19 December 2021. It was the final match of the 2021–22 Scottish League Cup, the 76th season of the Scottish League Cup (known as the Premier Sports Cup for sponsorship reasons), a competition for the 42 teams in the Scottish Professional Football League (SPFL). Three-time winners Hibernian met then-19-time winners Celtic after winning their respective semi-finals; Hibs defeating reigning league champions Rangers and Celtic overcoming the League Cup and Scottish Cup holders St Johnstone.

It was the 36th appearance in a League Cup final for Celtic and the 11th for Hibernian. It was also the fourth meeting of these clubs in a League Cup final, with Celtic having won in 1969 and 1974, and Hibs having won in 1972.

Match

Summary
Celtic largely controlled the first forty-five minutes, playing mostly within Hibernian's half with the majority of possession, however, failed to create chances that tested Matt Macey, bar a single shot on target by Greg Taylor.
On a rare forward venture, Hibernian scored off a corner-kick with their first shot on target in the 51st minute, as their captain Paul Hanlon headered the ball just beyond the goal-line. Celtic responded directly from kick-off, with captain Callum McGregor providing a through ball to Kyogo Furuhashi who slotted it into the bottom left corner. The Japanese forward collected his second of the match in the 72nd minute with a composed chip over Macey after a quickly taken free-kick by Tom Rogic. This goal would prove to be the winner, along with a 96th-minute save from Celtic goalkeeper Joe Hart, ensuring Celtic's 20th League Cup title.

Details

Notes

References

2021 D
2
Sports competitions in Glasgow
December 2021 sports events in the United Kingdom
League Cup final
Hibernian F.C. matches
Celtic F.C. matches
2020s in Glasgow